Elspeth McEwen or McKewan or Elizabeth MacEwan (died 24 August 1698) of Balmaclellan was the most famous convicted witch in Galloway and the last to be burnt at the stake there.

Accusations, imprisonment, torture, trial and execution
As an elderly educated woman (the 'old wife of Bogha') who lived alone, she was accused of tormenting her neighbours, for example by bewitching their poultry, causing hens, ducks or geese to stop (or increase) laying, fall ill or die. She supposedly kept a wooden pin hidden in her rafters, which she used to steal milk from any cow by first touching the udder with the pin. In 1696 she was summoned to the local church session on charges of witchcraft. Among the proofs of her guilt was the evidence that the minister's mare, on which she rode to the session, was terrorised and sweated drops of blood.

McEwen was then imprisoned for two years at the Kirkcudbright Tolbooth. During this time she was tortured to such a degree that she pleaded for the release of death. In March 1698 she was tried for the "horid cryme of witchcraft" and confessed to "a contract and regular commerce with the Devil, and of practising charms and other evil magical acts to the harm of the people".  There are detailed records of her imprisonment and trial.

On 24 August 1698 she was taken to Silver Craigs in Kirkcudbright where she was strangled and then burnt at the stake.  The expenses were carefully accounted:

References 

1698 deaths
People executed for witchcraft
People executed by Scotland by burning
17th-century Scottish women
Witch trials in Scotland
People from Dumfries and Galloway